Bridgit is a name with several traditional variant spellings. It may refer to:

 Bridgit Mendler, an American actress
 Bridgit (24 character), a fictional mercenary in the television drama 24
 Saint Bridgit (circa 451-525), Irish Christian nun
 The Celtic goddess Brigid

See also
 Bridget (given name)